2007 ACC tournament may refer to:

 2007 ACC men's basketball tournament
 2007 ACC women's basketball tournament
 2007 ACC men's soccer tournament
 2007 ACC women's soccer tournament
 2007 Atlantic Coast Conference baseball tournament
 2007 Atlantic Coast Conference softball tournament